The 1873 United States Senate special election in Massachusetts was held in March 1873 to fill the vacancy left by Senator Henry Wilson, who resigned to become Vice President of the United States. George S. Boutwell won the election.

At the time, Massachusetts elected United States senators by a majority vote of each separate house of the Massachusetts General Court, the House and the Senate. However, the Senate deadlocked in this race; it was moved that both houses would vote as one, and Boutwell won the combined vote.

Background
At the time, the Massachusetts legislature was dominated the Republican Party. Republicans held all but one of the State Senate seats and 211 of 240 state House seats.

Incumbent Senator Henry Wilson resigned from office upon his election as Vice President of the United States, creating a vacancy for the term ending in 1877.

Election

March 11 
Both houses of the General Court began balloting on March 11. Boutwell achieved a majority of the House on the second ballot, but the Senate deadlocked.

Senate President George Loring, who was a candidate for the seat, did not vote. One member was absent.

The third and fourth ballots were identical.

March 12 
Following Boutwell's victory in the House, it was widely expected the Senate would ratify their choice the next day. Dawes supporters convened a caucus and decided to continue their support. On the next day, it was moved that both Houses would vote as one to ratify the choice.

References

1873
Massachusetts
United States Senate
Massachusetts 1873
Massachusetts
United States Senate 1873